Tamás Turcsik (born 31 October 1990, in Miskolc) is a Hungarian, Honduran, defender who currently plays for Zalaegerszegi TE.

External links 
 HLSZ 

1990 births
Living people
Sportspeople from Miskolc
Hungarian footballers
Association football defenders
Zalaegerszegi TE players